Argyresthia abdominalis is a moth of the  family Yponomeutidae. It is found in most of Europe, except Ireland, the Iberian Peninsula, Slovenia, Greece, Ukraine and Lithuania.

The wingspan is 7–9 mm.

The larvae feed on Juniperus communis. A single larva mines out several leaves, feeding from the base to the tip. It migrates to the next leaf using a short corridor in the bark of the twig. Pupation takes place outside of the mine in a spinning on the twig. The larvae have an orange brown to spotted reddish brown body and a black head. They can be found from March to April.

References

External links
Lepiforum.de

Moths described in 1839
Argyresthia
Moths of Europe